Richard de Bokyngeham (fl. 1300–1301) was an English politician.

He was a Member (MP) of the Parliament of England for New Shoreham in 1300–01.

References

13th-century births
14th-century deaths
English MPs 1301